Pseudo Echo are an Australian new wave band formed in 1982, best known for their 1986 single "Funky Town". They released three studio albums before disbanding in 1989. The band reformed in 1998 and have released four further studio albums, and continue to tour Australia. They have released 7 studio albums, 2 live and 5 compilation albums as of 2021.

Albums

Studio albums

Live albums

Compilation albums

Singles

References

Discographies of Australian artists
Rock music group discographies
Pop music group discographies
New wave discographies